This is a list of early and legendary monarchs of Burma (Myanmar). It covers the monarchs of the early polities in Upper Burma, Lower Burma and Arakan, according to the various royal chronicles. The list consists of two types. Some of the dynasties were likely derived from "Indian legends taken from Sanskrit or Pali originals" in order to link the Burmese monarchy to the Buddha. Many others were actual historical figures cloaked in pre-Buddhist legends, and probably existed in a different time period than that described in the chronicles. Moreover, many of these historical-based legendary figures were likely contemporaries of rival small settlements, rather than in the continuous lineage presented by the chronicles.

Unless otherwise noted, the regnal dates in this article are abbreviated to the first Western calendar year only although the Burmese calendar straddles the Western calendar. For example, the start of King Pyinbya's reign, 208 ME (25 March 846 to 24 March 847 CE), is shown here only as 846 (instead of 846/47).

Upper Burma

First Tagaung dynasty
The first Tagaung dynasty was part of the Abhiyaza origin myth that made a "sudden appearance" in central Burma in 1781—in the treatise Mani Yadanabon. The myth was not part of any of the prior central Burmese chronicles and treaties, as well as those immediately after, including the 1798 Yazawin Thit chronicle. But the myth gained ascendancy with the Konbaung kings, and was finally included in the Hmannan Yazawin chronicle in 1832, officially linking the Konbaung and central Burmese kings to the Buddha. The proclamation was part of the regional traditions to link their leaders to the clan of the Buddha. The earliest evidence of such linkage was in Arakan in the 1450s. The Arakanese tradition had grown more elaborate by the early 17th century, and finally reached central Burma in the 18th century. It was embraced by the Konbaung kings who starting in the 1770s began an effort to delink the then prevailing pre-Buddhist origin myth of linking the monarchy to a solar spirit with a more universal (Buddhist) myth.

Second Tagaung dynasty
This is the list of kings of the second Tagaung dynasty per in the Hmannan Yazawin chronicle, which provides no reign dates except for the date when the Sri Ksetra Kingdom was founded by two princes from Tagaung. According to Michael Charney, the second Tagaung dynasty is simply a version of the same Abhiyaza myth—Daza Yaza/Dhajaraja is another title of Abhiyaza/Abhiraja—which the chroniclers of the Hmannan must have realized but nonetheless sequenced it as a successor dynasty to circumvent "any superior claim of legitimacy on the part of the royal line of western Burma" [Arakan].

Sri Ksetra Kingdom BCE 483-84

Early Pagan

Formative Early Pagan
The following is the list of Pagan kings as given in the main royal chronicles.

Middle Early Pagan (AD 613-846) 
All four main chronicles are in agreement with the regnal dates in this period.

Late Early Pagan (846-1044)
The chronicles again do not agree with the dates for this period. The dates in later chronicles Yazawin Thit and Hmannan Yazawin now depart from Maha Yazawin dates from 846 CE forward.

Lower Burma

Thaton Kingdom

Early Hanthawaddy
The list here is per Harvey who reported it from the Shwemawdaw Thamaing (lit. "History of Shwemawdaw Pagoda"); the dates are unattested. Other Mon Chronicles give a similar list of rulers from 573 to 781 with no records thereafter, leaving a gap of 276 years to Pagan's conquest of Pegu in 1057. Harvey's list better synchronizes with historically confirmed Pagan dates. But according to Michael Aung-Thwin, pre-Pagan Mon kingdoms of Lower Burma are later 15th century legends, unattested by evidence. Pegu as a place name only first appeared in a 1266 Old Burmese inscription.

Arakan

First Danyawaddy (2666–825 BCE)

Second Danyawaddy (825 BCE–146 CE)

Third Danyawaddy (146–788)

Wethali (327–818)

Notes

References
 
 
 
 
 
 
 
 
 
 

Lists of Burmese monarchs